D.915 is a north-to-south state road in northeastern Turkey. The  road starts at Of, Trabzon on the coast of the Black Sea branching from D.010 and ends in Aşkale, Erzurum joining D.100 running in a high-elevation mountainous terrain. The northern section ,which is the Derebaşı curves, is considered one of the most dangerous routes in the world.

The route's northern part runs through the districts of Trabzon Dernekpazarı and Çaykara, passes by Uzungöl and crosses Mount Soğanlı of the Karadeniz Mountain Range with the Soğanlı Pass at  AMSL on the province border Trabzon-Bayburt, and crosses over Çoruh River before joining D.050.

Starting on the junction of D.050 in Bayburt, the southern part of the route runs through Maden, crosses Mount Kop of the Otlukbeli Mountains with the Kop Pass at  AMSL just south of the province border Bayburt-Erzurum, where a highway tunnel is under construction to ease the route with several hairpin turns. It reaches Aşkale on the D.100 (E80). The route from Bayburt to Aşkale is part of E87.

Road from Of to Bayburt
The route without guardrails includes 29 steep hairpin turns. While the start and end sections of the route are paved with asphalt, the center part is only gravel. It is difficult to travel particularly in wet and dark conditions or by fog and snow, and it is considered as one of the most dangerous roads of the world, even more dangerous than the Death Road in Bolivia.

Named Derebaşı Turns, the most risky part of the route is situated in Çaykara with 13 hairpin turns.

References

915
Transport in Trabzon Province
Transport in Bayburt Province
Transport in Erzurum Province